Salisbury was launched c.1814 in the  almost certainly under another name and was possibly a prize. She was possibly captured by the British or sold to British owners in 1815. She made one voyage seal hunting in 1820 and transported settlers to South Africa in 1821. She was lost in 1827.

Origins and career
Salisbury origins and career are difficult to untangle because there were at various times several vessels by that name, all ranging between 117 and 125 tons burthen, and having similar trades. In 1821 Lloyd's Register (LR) carried two vessels named Salisbury, and the Register of Shipping carried four. It appears that LR missed one vessel completely and may have conflated two different vessels.

Salisbury first appeared in LR in 1815 with S. Creedy, master, London owners, and trade London–Sierra Leone. Her origins were given as a foreign prize. She first appeared in the Register of Shipping (RS) with J. Creedy, master, Craig, owner, and trade London–Africa. Her origins were given as Portugal, built in 1812. However, in 1818 RS had two listings for Salisbury while LR had one that seemingly combined the two listings in RS.

He sailed from England on 15 September, bound for the South Shetland Islands. He arrived at New South Shetland in January 1821 and left on 16 February. Salisbury called at Buenos Aires and arrived in the Downs on 13 May and in the Thames by 22 May. She returned with 9000, or 9,821, or 8,926 seal skins.

Settler transport: On 14 August 1821 Captain James King sailed from London with 20 settlers from England to South Africa. These were a private party and not under the auspices of the Government Settler Scheme. Salisbury reached Table Bay, Cape Town on 8 December and arrived at Algoa Bay, Port Elizabeth, on 15 January 1822. 

By 1825 the RS no longer listed the Salisbury of Portuguese origin; the other three Salisburys that had been present in 1821 were still listed. On 3 October 1825 a Salisbury was driven ashore and wrecked on Götaland, Sweden. She had been on a voyage from Liverpool, to Saint Petersburg.

Fate
Salisbury, of Liverpool, was lost off Cape Mount, Africa, on 1 June 1827. Her crew survived. Lloyd's List gave the name of her master as Bryan.

Citations and references
Citations

References
 

1814 ships
Age of Sail merchant ships of England
Sealing ships
Ships of the 1820 settlers
Maritime incidents in June 1827